Ski jumping at the 2020 Winter Youth Olympics will take place in Les Tuffes, France.

Medal summary

Medal table

Events

Qualification

Qualification summary

References

External links
Results book – Ski Jumping

 
Youth Olympics
2020 Winter Youth Olympics events
2020